Alan Larkin is a former Gaelic footballer who played for the Raheny club and for the Dublin county team.

Playing career
Larkin won his first all-Ireland with Dublin in 1974 when they defeated Galway 0-14 to 1-6. He won his second title with Dublin in 1977 when Dublin defeated Armagh 5-12 to 3-6. Larkin served as manager of the Dublin minor team and led them to an All-Ireland in the 1980s.

Post-football career
Larkin has worked for Ministers of the Word in Beaumont Hospital and in his own parish of Kilmore West. He coached a Dublin minor league team, which won the Leinster Championship in 1994. He is married to his wife, Rose, and together they have five children and three grandchildren.

References

Year of birth missing (living people)
Living people
Dublin inter-county Gaelic footballers
Gaelic football backs
Gaelic football managers
Raheny GAA footballers
Winners of two All-Ireland medals (Gaelic football)